The Colombian National Army Aviation is an aviation combat arms unit in the National Army of Colombia. Its history dates back to December 31, 1919, but was not fully developed until August 25, 1995 when this unit is officially activated under the name "Aviación Ejército" (Army Aviation). The Army Aviation was created to support ground operations from the air.

History
Military aviation began in Colombia in 1919 with the creation of a military aviation school for the Colombian Army. Previously by Law 15 of 1916 of September 7 to commissions were sent overseas to study new technological advancements in aviation, infantry, cavalry, engineering and trains. Officers pertaining to the Colombian Army were also sent to take a course on flight training on techniques and tactics. The school is then created in Colombia along with the Colombian National Army Aviation as a fifth regiment by Law 126 of 1919 of December 31 authorized by President of Colombia, Marco Fidel Suárez. The unit was officially activated on February 15, 1921 in Flandes, Department of Tolima with the support of French mission led by Lieutenant Colonel Rene Guichard. The Aviation School initially had 3 Caudron G.3 E-2, 3 Caudron G.4 A-2 and four Nieuport Delage 11 C-1. The school was closed due to financial hardships on 1922.

Current Order of Battle 
25th Army Aviation Brigade
 Army Aviation Operational Command (AAF Fuerte Tolemaida)

Army Aviation Airfield "TG. General Gustavo Rojas Pinilla"
 2nd Air Assault Aviation Battalion operating UH-60L 		
 3rd Equipment and Troop Transport Aviation Battalion operating Ми-17-1В/МД/B5 		
 4th Reconnaissance and Escort Aviation Battalion operating UH-1N 		
 5th Aerial Movement Aviation Battalion operating UH-1H-II 		
 Special Operations Aviation Battalion
 Aviation Training Battalion
 Aviation Maintenance Battalion
 25th Aviation Support and Service Battalion

Army Aviation Base Bogotà, El Dorado I.A.P.
 1st Aircraft Aviation Battalion operating AN-32A, C212-100, Ce208B, RC695/A and various Beech aircraft types
 Army Aviation School		
 Aviation Logistics and Service Battalion

Army Aviation
 Detachment of 2nd AAABn operating UH-60L 		
 Detachment of 4th REABn operating UH-1N 		
 Detachment of 5th AMABn operating UH-1H-II 
 6th Mobility and Manoeuvre Battalion operating helicopters detached from the parent units

Army Aviation Base San José del Guaviare
 Detachment of 2nd AAABn operating UH-60L
 Detachment of 4th REABn operating UH-1N 		
 Detachment of 5th AMABn operating UH-1H-II 
 4th Mobility and Manoeuvre Battalion operating helicopters detached from the parent units

Army Aviation Base Tumaco
 Detachment of 2nd AAABn operating UH-60L
 Detachment of 4th REABn operating UH-1N 		
 Detachment of 5th AMABn operating UH-1H-II

Batallón de Movilidad y Maniobra No. 1
Forward Operating Base Buena Vista
 1st Mobility and Manoeuvre Battalion operating helicopters detached from the parent units

Forward Operating Base Saravena
 5th Mobility and Manoeuvre Battalion operating helicopters detached from the parent units

Aircraft inventory 
While reliant on the Colombian Air Force for heavier air support, the Army maintains a fleet of 163 aircraft, including 141 helicopters.

See also 
 Army aviation

References

External links
  Colombia: Seguridad & Defensa - Unofficial site
  UNFFMM - Unofficial site

Army aviation
National Army of Colombia